Liksy Joseph is an Indian athlete. She represents India in the heptathlon.

Life
Liksy and Niksy were twins born to Gracy and K.M. Joseph in 1990 in Kerala.

She competed in the 2017 Asian Athletics Championships – Women's heptathlon. The race was won by her compatriot Swapna Barman and another teammate, Purnima Hembram, took the bronze.

References

Sportswomen from Kerala
Indian heptathletes
21st-century Indian women
21st-century Indian people
1990 births
Living people